Tappahannock is the oldest town in Essex County, Virginia, United States. The population was 2,375 at the 2010 census, up from 2,068 at the 2000 census. Located on the Rappahannock River, Tappahannock is the county seat of Essex County. Its name comes from an Algonquian language word lappihanne (also noted as toppehannock), meaning "Town on the rise and fall of water" or "where the tide ebbs and flows." The Rappahannock is a tidal estuary from above this point and downriver to its mouth on Chesapeake Bay.

In 1608 English explorer John Smith landed in Tappahannock and fought with the local Rappahannock tribe. After defeating them, he later made peace.

History
In the mid 1660s, Captain Richard Hobbs had rights to 800 acres south of Gilson's Creek at the Rappahannock River. In 1680, Virginia law required warehouses to be established in port towns, and that year surveyor George Morris created a survey showing Hobb His Hole Harbour [sic]. Hole means where a ship could drop anchor in a deep part of the water, and thus it was Capt. Hobbs who parked his ship "Elizabeth and Mary" here  in the vicinity of present-day Tappahannock. This area became known as "Hobbs Hole".

The port was established at Hobbs Hole and called "New Plymouth", later changed back to the Native American name "Tappahannock". As part of the Tobacco Inspection Act of 1730, public warehouses for inspection and exportation of tobacco, the colony's commodity crop, were established at Hobbs Hole. Ocean-going ships could reach this port.

During the War of 1812, the town was seized by British naval forces under the command of Captain Robert Barrie on December 2, 1814. The British left the town two days later, after burning down the courthouse and two jails.

The Tappahannock Historic District and Sabine Hall are listed on the National Register of Historic Places.

On February 24, 2016, the town was hit by a large EF3 tornado, causing massive damage.

Geography
Tappahannock is located on the east side of Essex County at  (37.922180, −76.863158), on the southwest bank of the Rappahannock River. The river is a wide, tidal estuary here.

U.S. Routes 17 and 360 pass through the town. US 17 passes through the center of town as Church Lane, leading northwest  to Fredericksburg and southeast  to Newport News. US 360 runs through town with US 17 on Church Lane, but turns east on Queen Street and crosses the mile-wide Rappahannock, continuing east  to its terminus in Reedville near the Chesapeake Bay. US 360 leads southwest from Tappahannock  to Richmond, the state capital.

Demographics

As of the census of 2000, there were 2,068 people, 857 households, and 495 families residing in the town. The population density was 793.6 people per square mile (305.9/km2). There were 946 housing units at an average density of 363.0 per square mile (139.9/km2). The racial makeup of the town was 54.60% White, 41.60% African American, 0.10% Native American, 2.50% Asian, 0.10% from other races, and 1.00% from two or more races. Hispanic or Latino of any race were 0.40% of the population.

There were 857 households, out of which 27.8% had children under the age of 18 living with them, 36.6% were married couples living together, 18.0% had a female householder with no husband present, and 42.2% were non-families. 35.8% of all households were made up of individuals, and 14.4% had someone living alone who was 65 years of age or older. The average household size was 2.23 and the average family size was 2.91.

In the town, the population was spread out, with 22.4% under the age of 18, 8.5% from 18 to 24, 27.0% from 25 to 44, 20.7% from 45 to 64, and 21.4% who were 65 years of age or older. The median age was 39 years. For every 100 females, there were 78.1 males. For every 100 females age 18 and over, there were 73.6 males.

The median income for a household in the town was $33,688, and the median income for a family was $41,579. Males had a median income of $28,409 versus $20,431 for females. The per capita income for the town was $17,862. About 10.6% of families and 14.5% of the population were below the poverty line, including 26.6% of those under age 18 and 6.7% of those age 65 or over.

Places
Prior to the opening of the new airport, the old Tappahannock Municipal Airport was located inside town limits.
 Lowery's, a longtime seafood restaurant, operated from 1938 to March 2020, affected by the COVID-19 pandemic.
 June Parker Marina was a small working marina located on what was originally known as Hobbs His Hole Harbor on Brockenborough Gut. This was the original port of Tappahannock. The town was designed around this harbor to efficiently transport tobacco from Marsh Street. Wagons could make one single left turn onto Water Lane, which ends at Hobbs His Hole Harbor, now June Parker Marina. Thousands of pounds of English ballast stone lies on the bottom of the river there, discarded hundreds of years ago for the export cargo of Essex tobacco.
 Tappahannock is located on the banks of the Rappahannock River. People traveling on U.S. Highway 360 from the northeast cross the Rappahannock via the Thomas Downing Bridge.
 The town is home to St. Margaret's School, a private boarding school.
 An historic debtors' prison is located here. It was constructed sometime before 1769. It is one of three such structures remaining in Virginia, along with those in Accomac and Worsham.  The prison building is part of the Tappahannock Historic District, and as such was listed on the National Register of Historic Places in 1973.

Notable residents

 Chris Brown, Grammy Award-winning R&B pop star, actor, songwriter, dancer
 Lorenzo Bundy, Major League Baseball coach
 Bill Dennis, NASCAR driver, Winston Cup Rookie of the Year, 1970
 Darryl Hammond, Arena Football Hall of Fame member
 Audrey Long, actress, attended school in Tappahannock
 Catharine Flood McCall, 19th-century businesswoman and plantation owner
 William "Bill" Moore,  blues artist
 Stacy Tutt, former New York Jets running back

References

External links
 Town of Tappahannock official website

Towns in Essex County, Virginia
Towns in Virginia
County seats in Virginia
Populated places established in 1682